Charles Murray (1754–1821) was a Scottish actor and dramatist.

Life
The son of Sir John Murray of Broughton, he was born at Cheshunt in Hertfordshire. He spent some time in France, studied pharmacy and surgery in London, and went surgeon's mate on some Mediterranean voyages.

Stage career
After playing as an amateur in Liverpool Murray went, with an introduction from Younger, the theatre manager there, to Tate Wilkinson of the York circuit. He made his first professional stage appearance at York, under the name of Raymur, and playing Carlos in Love Makes a Man (Colley Cibber). A quarrel in a tavern in Wakefield in September 1776 lost him his position.

After further time at sea Murray acted under his own name with Griffiths at Norwich. On 8 October 1785, as Sir Giles Overreach in A New Way to pay Old Debts, he made his first appearance in Bath. Here he remained until 1796, playing a great variety of parts. His wife Mrs. Murray occasionally played with him, and on 1 July 1793, for the benefit of her father and of her mother, who played Queen Elinor, his young daughter Harriet Murray made her first stage appearance as Prince Arthur. She subsequently played Titania, and on Mrs. Murray's final benefit in Bath on 19 May 1796, Fine Lady in David Garrick's Lethe. On this occasion Murray spoke a farewell address.

At Covent Garden
Murray came to Covent Garden with a good reputation; his first appearance in London took place on 30 September as Shylock, with, it is said, Bagatelle in The Poor Soldier (John O'Keeffe and William Shield). He was found better suited for secondary parts. For his benefit, on 12 May 1798, he was Polixenes in The Winter's Tale,  Harriet Murray making, as Perdita, her first appearance in London. He was on 11 October 1798 the original Baron Wildenhaim in Elizabeth Inchbald's Lovers' Vows. In 1802 he played the title role in Matthew Lewis's tragedy Alfonso, King of Castile. Murray's last appearance at Covent Garden appears to have been on 17 July 1817 as Brabantio to the Othello of Charles Mayne Young, the Iago of Junius Brutus Booth, and the Desdemona of Elizabeth O'Neill.

Last years
The Theatrical Inquisitor of February 1817 spoke of Murray as a veteran, and made reference to his infirmities. Threatened with paralysis, he went to Edinburgh to be near his children, Harriet Siddons (Mrs. Henry Siddons) and William Henry Murray, and died there on 8 November 1821.

Notes

Attribution

1754 births
1821 deaths
Scottish male stage actors
Scottish dramatists and playwrights
18th-century British male actors
18th-century Scottish male actors